Flora is an unincorporated community in Benson County, North Dakota, United States. The unincorporated community takes its name from Flora Schuyler, having previously, until 1901, been named Schuyler after William Schuyler, her brother, who was a townsite owner.

References

Unincorporated communities in North Dakota
Unincorporated communities in Benson County, North Dakota